This is a list of airports in the Philippines, grouped by type.

Classification
Regulation of airports and aviation in the Philippines lies with the Civil Aviation Authority of the Philippines (CAAP). The CAAP's classification system, introduced in 2008, rationalizes the previous Air Transportation Office (ATO) system of airport classification, pursuant to the Philippine Transport Strategic Study and the 1992 Civil Aviation Master Plan. The list is updated every three years, or as the need arises.

In the current classification system, 88 airports owned by the national government are placed into one of three main categories:

1. International airports are airports capable of handling international flights and have border control facilities. Airports in this category include airports that currently serve, or previously served, international destinations. There are currently 8 airports in this category. Seven of these airports were in the initial CAAP list in 2008: Clark, Davao, Laoag, Mactan–Cebu, Manila–Ninoy Aquino, Kalibo and Puerto Princesa. The only airport elevated to international status since 2008 has been the Iloilo Airport, where scheduled international service began in 2012.

Both the Bohol–Panglao International Airport in Bohol and the Bicol International Airport in Albay, while billed as international airports, have yet to be formally placed into this category as of February 2022, while the General Santos, Subic Bay and Zamboanga international airports, though still retaining their names, were subsequently downgraded by the CAAP.

2. Principal airports are airports which serve domestic destinations. There are 40 in total.  This category is further subdivided into two types:
Class 1 principal airports are airports capable of serving jet aircraft with a capacity of at least 100 seats (but could be 70). As of February 2022 there are 21 airports under this sub-category, all of which have regularly-scheduled air service. Both new "international" airports built and opened after the Iloilo International Airport (Bohol–Panglao and Bicol), as well as the international airports since downgraded by the CAAP, are officially classified under this sub-category, while four airports were upgraded: Godofredo P. Ramos Airport in Aklan and Sanga-Sanga Airport in Tawi-Tawi, formerly Class 2 principal airports, and the Cauayan and Ozamiz airports, formerly community airports.
Class 2 principal airports are airports capable of serving propeller aircraft with a capacity of at least 19 seats. There are 19 airports under this sub-category, most of which have regularly-scheduled air service. In February 2022, the CAAP classified the previously unclassified San Vicente and Manila–Sangley Point airports under this sub-category.

3. Community airports are airports that are used primarily for general aviation. There are currently 40 airports in this category. Only a few community airports, such as Siquijor Airport and Vigan Airport, have regularly-scheduled air service. In February 2022, the CAAP classified the previously unclassified M'lang airport under this category.

All privately owned aerodromes (airports, airstrips, airfields) are outside of the CAAP's classification system.

Former ATO classification
The old ATO system, in use until 2008, categorized the country's public airports into four types:

1. International airports were airports capable of handling international flights. There were two sub-categories of international airports:
 Regular International airports were "used for the operation of aircraft engaged in international air navigation," and served as country's primary international gateways. In 2004, Manila and Mactan–Cebu were the only airports in this category. Clark and Subic Bay were later given this status.
Alternate International airports  were airports capable of handling international flights in lieu of the regular international airports, but were not designated as primary international gateways. The four airports of Davao, General Santos, Laoag and Zamboanga were classified as such.

2. Trunkline airports were airports serving the principal commercial centers of the Philippines, intended for use by medium-range jets. These were, in most cases, the only domestic airports equipped with instrument landing systems. Twelve airports were classified under this category in 2004. Prior to their closure or conversion to military use, the former domestic airports of Bacolod, Cagayan de Oro and Iloilo were considered trunkline airports.

3. Secondary airports were airports serving smaller urban areas capable of at least handling smaller propeller aircraft, though some were capable of supporting jet aircraft. These airports were only open from sunrise until sunset, usually requiring notification of airport authorities if nighttime landing is a necessity. In 2004 a total of 25 facilities were considered secondary airports. Prior to its conversion to Rajah Buayan Air Base, Buayan Airport — the former commercial airport for General Santos — was classified as a secondary airport.

4. Feeder airports were airports capable of handling smaller piston aircraft. Many facilities in this category were small airstrips serving more remote areas. In 2004 a total of 42 facilities were considered feeder airports. Prior to their closure or transfer to private ownership, the airports of Dolores, Lucena and Malaybalay were under this classification.

This classification was made obsolete after the Air Transportation Office was replaced by the Civil Aviation Authority of the Philippines, the successor agency created by virtue of Republic Act No. 9497.

List of CAAP-classified airports
The lists below follow the CAAP's classification for airports in the Philippines, as of February 2022. Airport names in bold have scheduled service on commercial airlines.

NOTE on ICAO codes: Under the current ICAO code assignment scheme, airports in the Luzon island group (including the Cuyo Islands, but excluding Masbate, Romblon and the rest of Palawan) and the Caluya Islands of Antique are assigned RPL- and RPU- codes; those in the Visayas (except Caluya), Masbate, Romblon and Palawan (except Cuyo), RPV- and RPS-; and those in Mindanao, RPM- and RPN-. Italicized are unofficial ICAO airport codes, i.e. those which do not fit the current code assignment scheme (RPEN, RPPN, RPTP), or are temporary placeholder codes containing numbers (RP12 through 17).

International airports

Principal domestic airports

Community airports

Unclassified aerodromes
The various civilian aerodromes listed in this section remain unclassified. These airports, airfields, airstrips and seaplane terminals are owned and operated by individuals, corporations, or local governments.

Many of these aerodromes were purposely built to service the surrounding area's dominant industry; such are located close to tourist areas, agricultural plantations, mines and logging concessions. Some small airstrips, such as those in Sagpangan, Limasawa and Dibagat, were built to facilitate missionary work in remote areas.

Not all of the listed aerodromes in this section necessarily have a valid aerodrome certificate from the CAAP. Many are non-operational, abandoned, inactive or already closed. Aerodromes which appear in the latest satellite imagery to no longer be usable due to redevelopment are marked with a strikethrough. Airport codes that are now obsolete are enclosed in brackets.

Only a few of the aerodromes below see some amount of chartered or regularly scheduled cargo and/or commercial air traffic, usually with the use of smaller aircraft.

Military airfields

Airports being planned or under construction
The list below only includes new air transportation facilities being proposed or are under construction.

Closed airports

 Bacolod Domestic Airport – closed in 2008; replaced by Bacolod–Silay Airport which inherited its IATA (BCD) and ICAO (RPVB) codes
()
 Malaybalay Airport (RPMY) – closed in the late 1990s, converted to low-cost housing area; its ICAO code was later reassigned to Laguindingan Airport
()
 Mandurriao Airport – closed on June 13, 2007; replaced by Iloilo International Airport which inherited its IATA (ILO) and ICAO (RPVI) codes
(Coordinates )
 Lumbia Airport (RPML) – closed for civilian flights on June 15, 2013 and converted for military use; replaced by Laguindingan Airport
()
 Tagbilaran Airport (RPVT) – closed on November 27, 2018; replaced by Bohol–Panglao International Airport which inherited its IATA code (TAG) and replaced its ICAO from (RPVT) to (RPSP)
()
 Legazpi Airport (RPLP) – closed on October 7, 2021; replaced by Bicol International Airport and replaced its IATA from (LGP) to (DRP) and ICAO from (RPLP) to (RPLK)
(Coordinates:)

See also
 Busiest airports in the Philippines
 Airports in the Greater Manila Area
 Transportation in the Philippines
 List of airports by ICAO code: R#RP - Philippines
 Wikipedia:WikiProject Aviation/Airline destination lists: Asia#Philippines

References

External links
 Civil Aviation Authority of the Philippines
Sources of airport codes and data:
 IATA Airline and Airport Code Search
 ICAO Location Indicators by State, as of 12 January 2006 – ICAO airport codes, including redundant former codes
 World Aero Data: Airports in the Philippines – ICAO codes and airport data from DAFIF
Airports in the Philippines by other links:
 Aviation Safety Network: Philippines
 Great Circle Mapper: Philippines
 Our Airports: Philippines

Philippines
Philippines
 
Airports
Airports